Iowa wine refers to wine manufactured in the U.S. state of Iowa.  Iowa presents many challenges to viticulture including very warm summer days that can promote fungal vine diseases, and extremely cold winter nights that can kill many varieties of grapevines.  Most commercial viticulture in Iowa focuses on French hybrid and native American grape varieties, with relatively few plantings of Vitis vinifera grapes.  Many Iowa wineries also import grapes and juice from other states and countries in order to produce wine varietals otherwise not possible due to Iowa's harsh winter months that will not permit such grapes to survive. Iowa is home to 100 commercial wineries and more than 300 vineyards covering 1,200+ acres.  Northeastern Iowa is included in the Upper Mississippi Valley AVA while the western part of the state is in the new AVA designation named Loess Hills.

See also
American wine
Upper Mississippi Valley AVA
Loess Hills District AVA

References

External links
Iowa Wine Growers Association

 
Wine regions of the United States by state
Wine
American wine